Ioan Lupaș (8 June 1914 – 8 April 1981) was a Romanian footballer and manager.

International career
Ioan Lupaș played eight games at international level for Romania, making his debut in a friendly which ended with a 1–0 loss against Italy.

Honours

Player
Venus București
Divizia A: 1939–40
Cupa României runner-up: 1939–40
FC Ploiești
Divizia B: 1946–47

Manager
Progresul București
Cupa României runner-up: 1957–58

Notes

References

External links
Ioan Lupaș player profile at Labtof.ro
Ioan Lupaș manager profile at Labtof.ro

1914 births
1981 deaths
Romanian footballers
Romania international footballers
Association football midfielders
Liga I players
Liga II players
Venus București players
FC Progresul București players
Romanian football managers
FC Progresul București managers
Sportspeople from Arad, Romania